Saeed Akbar Khan Nawani (born 8 June 1955) is a Pakistani politician and a member of the 15th Punjab Assembly.

Political career 
He has been successively elected as Member of Punjab Assembly since 1985 having returned to Punjab Assembly for the seventh consecutive term in general elections 2008. He de-seated due to vote against party policy for Chief Minister of Punjab election  on 16 April 2022.

References

Living people
Pakistan Muslim League (N) politicians
Politicians from Punjab, Pakistan
People from Bhakkar District
Punjabi people
University of the Punjab alumni
1955 births
Punjab MPAs 1985–1988
Punjab MPAs 1988–1990
Punjab MPAs 1990–1993
Punjab MPAs 1997–1999
Punjab MPAs 2002–2007
Punjab MPAs 2008–2013
Punjab MPAs 2018–2023